Henry Bartlett may refer to:
Sir David Bartlett, 3rd Baronet ( Henry David Hardington Bartlett, 1912–1989), British fencer
Henry Bartlett (MP) (fl. 1406–1410), MP for Bath

See also

Bartlett (disambiguation)